Sternycha is a genus of longhorn beetles of the subfamily Lamiinae, containing the following species:

 Sternycha approximata Dillon & Dillon, 1945
 Sternycha clivosa Martins & Galileo, 1990
 Sternycha diasi Martins & Galileo, 1990
 Sternycha ecuatoriana Martins & Galileo, 2007
 Sternycha panamensis Martins & Galileo, 1999
 Sternycha paupera (Bates, 1885)
 Sternycha sternalis Dillon & Dillon, 1945

References

Onciderini